Kevin White (born 2 June 1958) is a New Zealand cricketer. He played in two first-class matches, one for Central Districts and one for Northern Districts, in 1978/79 and 1979/80.

References

External links
 

1958 births
Living people
Central Districts cricketers
Cricketers from Dannevirke
New Zealand cricketers
Northern Districts cricketers